Manolete, also known as The Passion Within in the United Kingdom, Blood and Passion in Canada, and A Matador's Mistress in the United States, is a 2008 biopic of bullfighter Manuel Laureano Rodríguez Sánchez, better known as "Manolete". The film was written and directed by Menno Meyjes. This is the first film from HandMade Films since Lock, Stock and Two Smoking Barrels (1998).

Plot
The Menno Meyjes directed drama stars Adrien Brody as Spanish bullfighter Manolete, in a film that covers his late life love affair with actress Lupe Sino (Penélope Cruz) before he was gored to death in the bull ring. Sino's communist politics turned their affair into a scandal in the early 1940s, especially after discovering her previous marriage to a PCE member. The film begins with Manolete's last day in Linares.

Cast
 Adrien Brody as Manuel Laureano Rodríguez Sánchez, a.k.a. "Manolete"
 Penélope Cruz as Antoñita "Lupe" Sino
 Santiago Segura as Guillermo
 Ann Mitchell as Doña Angustias
 Josep Linuesa as Enrique de Ahumada
 Juan Echanove as Pepe Cámara
 Pedro Casablanc as General
 Tomas Rozzi as the 'dealer'
 Nacho Aldeguer as Luis Miguel Dominguín
 Diego Martín
 Berta de la Dehesa
 Rubén Ochandiano
 Omar Muñoz as young Manolete
 Denise Moreno as girl
 Cayetano Rivera Ordóñez as Torero

Release
The film premiered on 28 August 2008 in the Toronto International Film Festival.

Despite a planned release date of 2007, the film faced several production delays and a spiralling budget. Although it was scheduled for a theatrical release in France on 31 March 2010, Deadline's Mike Fleming reported that, "Even though the film stars two Oscar winners, it never found any takers for a theatrical run." The film has been shelved since 2007.

In April 2011 -  Xenon Pictures CEO Leigh Savidge announced that on 7 June 2011 Xenon Pictures would release a newly edited version of A Matador's Mistress on DVD.

Gravitas Ventures announced on 14 March 2011 that it has acquired VOD and digital rights to Manolete. Gravitas, which is licensing the film from Viva Pictures, plans to release the film on demand via cable, satellite, telco and online in June 2011. "We are confident no one is better positioned to exploit this epic high-value production on a digital platform," said Viva president Victor Elizalde.

Controversy
Although bullfighting scenes were shot expensively without bulls, animal rights activists have encouraged a boycott of the film. Protestors reject what they perceive to be a glamorous image of a matador on film. "It is inadmissible to release a film in which the hero is a matador," said the Alliance Anticorrida, a French anti-bullfighting group, in a message to its 20,000 members. "If they are properly informed, a great number of spectators will avoid this new film."

Filming locations
The film was shot in 2005, four years before Cruz won her Oscar for Vicky Cristina Barcelona.
 Córdoba, Spain
 Alcoy, Alicante, Spain
 Alicante, Spain
 Madrid, Spain
 El Puerto de Santa María, Cádiz, Spain
 Sanlúcar de Barrameda, Cádiz, Spain

See also
 Manolete

References

External links
 
 
 
 Adrien Brody discusses preparing for the role with matador Cayetano Rivera Ordóñez in the March 2008 issue of Men's Vogue

2008 films
2000s historical drama films
Bullfighting films
British historical drama films
Spanish historical drama films
English-language Spanish films
2000s Spanish-language films
HandMade Films films
Films set in the 1940s
Films shot in Madrid
Biographical films about sportspeople
Cultural depictions of bullfighters
Cultural depictions of Spanish men
Films shot at Ciudad de la Luz
Films scored by Gabriel Yared
2000s English-language films
2000s British films